NGC 6914 is a reflection nebula located approximately 6,000 light-years away in the constellation of Cygnus, and was discovered by Édouard Stephan on August 29, 1881. Ultraviolet radiation from stars in the Cygnus OB2 association ionize the nebula's hydrogen.

References

External links
 

Reflection nebulae
H II regions
Cygnus (constellation)
6914
18810829
Star-forming regions
Discoveries by Édouard Stephan